This is the transfer campaign from Russian Basketball Super League 2007/2008:

CSKA Moscow

In
 Ramūnas Šiškauskas - Signed From  Panathinaikos
 Marcus Goree - Signed From  Benetton Treviso
 Nikos Zisis - Signed From  Benetton Treviso
 Alexey Shved - Signed From  Khimki Moscow Region
 Artem Zabelin - Signed From  Avtodor Saratov
 Tomas Van Den Spiegel - Signed From  Prokom
 Viktor Khryapa - Signed From  Chicago Bulls

Out
 Tomas Van Den Spiegel - Transferred To  Prokom
 Óscar Torres - Transferred To  Fortitudo Bologna
  Anton Ponkrashov - Loaned To  Khimki Moscow Region
 David Vanterpool
  Nikita Kurbanov - Loaned To  UNICS Kazan

UNICS Kazan

In
 Virgil Stanescu - Signed From  Spartak Primorje
 Viktor Keirou - Signed From  Spartak Primorje
  Tariq Kirksay - Signed From  SLUC Nancy
 Joseph Forte - Signed From  Montepaschi Siena
  Nikolay Padius - Signed From  Triumph Lyubertsy
 Pavel Sergeev - Signed From  Spartak St. Petersburg
 Marko Tušek - Signed From  ViveMenorca
 Aco Petrović (Head Coach) - Signed From  Lokomotiv Rostov
 Nikita Kurbanov - Signed From  CSKA Moscow

Out
 Petr Samoylenko - Transferred To  Dynamo Moscow
 Kšyštof Lavrinovič - Transferred To  Montepaschi Siena
 Yahor Meshcharnakou - Transferred To  Azovmash Mariupol
 Jarod Stevenson - Transferred To  Akasvayu Girona
 Saulius Štombergas - Retired
   Aleksander Miloserdov - Transferred To  Universitet Yugra
   Antanas Sireika (Head Coach)

Khimki Moscow Region

In
  Anton Ponkrashov - Loaned From CSKA Moscow
 Nikita Shabalkin - Signed From  CSK VSS Samara
 Nikita Morgunov - Signed From  Triumph Lyubertsy
 Teemu Rannikko - Signed From  Olimpija Ljubljana
 Daniel Ewing - Signed From  Los Angeles Clippers
  Mike Wilkinson - Signed From  Aris Thessaloniki
  Pat Burke - Signed From  Phoenix Suns

Out
 Gianmarco Pozzecco - Transferred To  UPEA Capo
 Alexey Shved - Transferred To  CSKA Moscow
 Rubén Wolkowyski - Transferred To  Prokom
 Melvin Booker - Transferred To  Armani Jeans Milano

Dynamo Moscow

In
 Svetislav Pešić (Head Coach)  - Signed From  Akasvayu Girona 
 Petr Samoylenko  - Signed From  UNICS Kazan
  Henry Domercant  - Signed From  Olympiacos
 Aleksandr Rasič  - Signed From  Efes Pilsen
 Nikola Prkačin  - Signed From  Efes Pilsen
 Robertas Javtokas  - Signed From  Panathinaikos
 Miloš Vujanić  - Signed From  Panathinaikos

Out
 Dušan Ivković (Head Coach)  - Transferred To  Serbia national basketball team
 Bojan Popović - Transferred To  Unicaja Málaga
 Eddie Gill - Transferred To  New Jersey Nets
 Taquan Dean - Transferred To  Casale Monferrato
 Lazaros Papadopoulos - Transferred To  Real Madrid
 Andrei Trushkin - Transferred To  CSK VSS Samara
 Miroslav Raičević - Transferred To  Napoli
 Aleksandar Rašić - Loaned To  ALBA Berlin

Lokomotiv Rostov

In
 Oleg Meleschenko  (Head Coach)  - Signed From  Khimki Moscow Region 
  Sergei Karaulov  - Signed From  Standart Samara
 Anthony Goldwire  - Signed From  Panellinios
 Szymon Szewczyk  - Signed From  Scafati
 Nestoras Kommatos  - Signed From  AEK
 Junior Harrington  - Signed From  Memphis Grizzlies
 Dimitris Marmarinos

Out
 Aco Petrović (Head Coach) - Transferred To  UNICS Kazan
 Sergei Toporov - Transferred To  Triumph
 Maurice Bailey - Transferred To  Olimpija Ljubljana
 Vangelis Sklavos - Transferred To  Panellinios
 Omar Sneed - Transferred To  Kaveh

Triumph Lyubertsy

In
 Mire Chatman  - Signed From  Lottomatica Virtus Roma
  Ognjen Aškrabić  - Signed From  Lottomatica Virtus Roma
 Sergei Toporov  - Signed From  Lokomotiv Rostov
 Egor Vyaltsev  - Signed From  Ural Great
 Terrell Lyday  - Signed From  Benetton Treviso
 Nikola Vasic  - Signed From  Alicante
 Uroš Slokar  - Signed From  Toronto Raptors
 Fedor Dmitriev  - Signed From  Spartak St. Petersburg

Out
 Nikolay Padius - Transferred To  UNICS Kazan
 Giedrius Gustas - Transferred To  Barons LMT
 Sergei Demeshkin - Transferred To  CSK VSS Samara
 Roderick Blakney - Transferred To  Olympiacos

Spartak Primorje

In
 Damir Miljkovic  - Signed From  Panionios Forthnet
 Vidas Ginevičius  - Signed From  Panionios Forthnet
 Alexei Ekimov  - Signed From  Spartak St. Petersburg
  Stanislav Makshantsev  - Signed From  Ural Great
 Aleksandr Fomin  - Signed From  Ural Great
 J. R. Bremer  - Signed From  Bosna
  Vadim Panin  - Signed From  UNICS Kazan
  Vladimir Boisa  - Signed From  Montepaschi Siena

Out
 Virgil Stanescu - Transferred To  UNICS Kazan
 Viktor Keirou - Transferred To  UNICS Kazan
 Andrei Tsypachev  - Transferred To  Universitet Yugra
 Willie Deane - Transferred To  Lukoil Academic
 Derrick Phelps

Spartak St. Petersburg

In
  Damir Markota  - Signed From  Milwaukee Bucks
  Konstantin Nesterov  - Signed From  UNICS Kazan
 Milovan Raković  - Signed From  Mega Ishrana
 Joe Troy Smith  - Signed From  Rieti
  Antonio Porta  - Signed From  Angelico Biella
 Rafael Araújo  - Signed From  Utah Jazz

Out
 Fedor Dmitriev - Transferred To  Triumph
 Pavel Sergeev - Transferred To  UNICS Kazan
  Boniface N'Dong - Transferred To  Unicaja
 Alexei Ekimov - Transferred To  Spartak Primorje

Universitet Yugra

In
  Aleksander Miloserdov  - Signed From   UNICS Kazan
 Andrei Tsypachev  - Signed From  Spartak Primorje
 Chudney Gray  - Signed From  Al-Rayyan
 Rod Nealy  - Signed From  Ginebra Kings
  Kevin Fletcher  - Signed From  Aris
 Jelani Gardner  - Signed From  APOEL

Out
 Vladimir Shevel - Transferred To  Ural Great
 Fred Warrick - Transferred To  Enisey
 Chad Austin - Transferred To  BCM Gravelines
 Rod Nealy

CSK VSS Samara

In
 Alex Scales  - Signed From  Aris
 Sergei Demeshkin  - Signed From  Triumph
  Cirill Makanda-Etogo  - Signed From  Keravnos
 Marque Perry  - Signed From  Banvitspor
 Yaniv Green  - Signed From  Maccabi Tel Aviv
 Andrei Trushkin   - Signed From  Dynamo Moscow

Out
 Nikita Shabalkin - Transferred To  Khimki Moscow Region
 Aleksei Kiryanov - Transferred To  Sibirtelecom Lokomotiv
  Pavel Ulyanko - Transferred To   Lvivska Politekhnika
 Oleg Baranov - Transferred To  Sibirtelecom Lokomotiv
 Kelvin Gibbs  - Transferred To  Olympiada Patras

Ural Great

In
 Drazen Anzulovic (Head Coach) - Signed From  Cibona
 Andrew Wisniewski - Signed From  Cibona
 Brent Wright - Signed From  Cibona
 Sergei Varlamov - Signed From  Standart Samara
  Vanja Plisnić - Signed From  Hemofarm
 Ivan Koljević - Signed From  Lietuvos Rytas
 Vladimir Shevel - Signed From  Universitet Yugra
  Ralph Biggs - Signed From  Charleroi

Out
 Sergei Zozoulin (Head Coach)
 Zagorac Zeljko - Transferred To  Anwil Włocławek
 Egor Vyaltsev - Transferred To  Triumph
  Stanislav Makshantsev - Transferred To  Spartak Primorje
  Maurice Whitfield - Transferred To  Olympiada Patras
 Derrick Tarver  - Transferred To  Legea

transfers